The Montreux Healthcare Fund is one of the top European hedge funds. Its headquarters is near Hampton Court Palace. It was founded in 2010 and focuses on private specialist healthcare for people living with learning difficulties, mental health issues, and physical injuries in the UK. It had a 21.46% three year annualised return at the end of March 2018 and has £125 million assets. It has £95 million support from BlackRock to support acquisition opportunities.

It owns Active Assistance, based in Sevenoaks which specialises in the care of patients with spinal cord and acquired brain injuries.  It bought Chester Healthcare Ltd, a nurse staffing company based in Chester,  also known as “Jane Lewis”,  in November 2018.  In January 2019 it bought Independence Care Homes, a major provider of epilepsy care in the South East of England.   

It held a majority equity stake in the Regard Partnership, the ninth largest care group, which provides  learning disability and mental health care and support. It sold the business to AMP Capital in December 2017.

In 2021 it bought Active Assistance, which provides specialist care to people with acquired brain and spinal cord injury in domiciliary and residential settings.

References

Hedge fund firms in the United Kingdom
Private medicine in the United Kingdom